Stuart James McCullum (born 6 December 1956) is a New Zealand former cricketer who played for Otago throughout his career. A left-handed opening batsman who occasionally kept-wicket, he is the father of New Zealand international players Brendon and Nathan McCullum.

See also
 List of Otago representative cricketers

References

1956 births
Living people
Otago cricketers
New Zealand cricketers
People from Eltham, New Zealand